Smash was a Japanese puroresu and combat sports promotion, founded in December 2009 following the folding of Hustle. In the fall of 2009 Hustle ran into financial problems that led to several show cancellations. After a planned restructuring and restarting of the promotion failed, a number of officials and wrestlers decided to start a new project. Smash held its first show on March 26, 2010.

Smash promoted three divisions: professional wrestling, mixed martial arts and kickboxing. The professional wrestling branch is led by Yoshihiro Tajiri, while Akira Shoji is responsible for the MMA branch. Yuji Shimada leads the overall supervision of the whole project. Since 2010 Smash has had an active exchange of wrestlers with the Finnish Fight Club Finland promotion.

In April 2011, it was announced that Deep and the MMA division of Smash had formed an amateur promotion named the Japan MMA League (JML).

On February 10, 2012, Smash announced that the promotion would be folding after its March 14 event, following a disagreement between Tajiri and financial backer (Quantum Jump Japan CEO) Masakazu Sakai. On April 5, 2012, Tajiri announced the follow-up promotion to Smash, Wrestling New Classic, which would hold its first event on April 26. On June 1, 2012, Sakai and his Smash backers bought Pancrase, officially incorporating Smash's MMA division into the promotion and re-affirming the partnership with Deep in JML.

Roster

Smash Seikigun
AKIRA
Jiro Kuroshio
Koji Doi
Lin Bairon
Makoto
Syuri
TAJIRI
Yoshiaki Yago
Yusuke Kodama

Fight Club Finland
Hajime Ohara
Jessica Love
StarBuck

Triple Tails.S
Kana
Mio Shirai

Unaffiliated
Aki Shizuku
Dave Finlay
Genichiro Tenryu
Kim Namhun
Mentallo
Takuya Kito
Tomoka Nakagawa
Último Dragón
Yo-Hey

Notable guests

Akira Shoji
Atsushi Kotoge
Ayumi Kurihara
Big Boy 
Bushwhacker Luke Williams
Cherry
Chii Tomiya
D-Ray 3000
Daisuke Harada
Danny Duggan
El Samurai
Emi Sakura
Eugene
Funaki
Gabriel Antonic
Gypsy Joe
Hikari Minami
Hikaru Shida
Io Shirai
Isami Kodaka
Jun Kasai
Jyushin Thunder Liger
Kaori Yoneyama
Kaoru
Kaz Hayashi
Kenso
Kushida
Leatherface
Meiko Satomura
Michael Kovac

Minoru Suzuki
Mitsuo Momota
Mochi Miyagi
Murat Bosporus
Nagisa Nozaki
Nanae Takahashi
Nunzio
Prince Devitt
Riho
Rob Raw
Sabu
Sayaka Obihiro
Scotty 2 Hotty
Serena
Sugar Dunkerton
Super Crazy
Taka Michinoku
Takao Omori
Takashi Iizuka
Tatsumi Fujinami
Tetsuya Naito
Tommy Dreamer
Toshie Uematsu
Tsubasa Kuragaki
Tsukasa Fujimoto
Tsukushi
Veneno
Yoshiaki Fujiwara

Championships

See also

Professional wrestling in Japan

References

External links

Japanese professional wrestling promotions
Mixed martial arts organizations
2010 establishments in Japan